Éva Janikovszky (April 23, 1926 in Szeged – July 14, 2003 in Budapest) was a Hungarian writer.

She wrote novels for both children and adults, but she is primarily known for her children's books, translated into 35 languages. Her first book was published in 1957. Among her most famous picture books are If I Were a Grown-Up and Who Does This Kid Take After?

She won the Deutscher Jugendliteraturpreis in 1973.

References

Hungarian children's writers
1926 births
2003 deaths
People from Szeged
Hungarian women children's writers
Hungarian women novelists
20th-century Hungarian novelists
20th-century Hungarian women writers
Burials at Farkasréti Cemetery